Charles Dillingham  was the Managing Director of the Center Theatre Group in Los Angeles from 1991 through, June 30, 2011.  Prior to CTG, he was CEO of The Entertainment Corporation USA, presenting the Bolshoi Ballet, Bolshoi Opera, Kirov Ballet, Kirov Opera and Royal Ballet at the Metropolitan Opera House and on U.S. tours. He was executive director of American Ballet Theatre when Mikhail Baryshnikov was artistic director, managing director of the Brooklyn Academy of Music Theatre Company, general manager of the American Conservatory Theater in San Francisco and general manager of the Williamstown Theatre Festival. He has served on the board of LA Stage Alliance and on theatre advisory panels at the California Arts Council and the National Endowment for the Arts and on the Board of Arts for L.A.. He is a member of the Board of Councilors of the USC School of Theatre, and the Executive Committee of the League of Resident Theatres.

References

External links
 CTG Official website
 

Living people
Year of birth missing (living people)
American theatre directors
Ballet impresarios
Yale School of Drama alumni